Ferroviário Esporte Clube, commonly known as Ferroviário-ST, is a Brazilian football club based in Serra Talhada, Pernambuco state. They competed in the Série C once.

History
The club was founded on September 15, 1979. Ferroviário-ST won the Campeonato Pernambucano Second Level in 1997.

Stadium
Ferroviário Esporte Clube play their home games at Estádio Nildo Pereira de Menezes, nicknamed Pereirão. The stadium has a maximum capacity of 5,000 people.

Achievements

 Campeonato Pernambucano Second Level:
 Winners (1): 1997

References

Football clubs in Pernambuco
Association football clubs established in 1979
1979 establishments in Brazil